Liga ASOBAL 2005–06 season was the 16th since its establishment. A total of 16 teams competed this season for the championship.

Competition format
The competition was played in a round-robin format, through 30 rounds. The team with most points earned wins the championship. The last two teams were relegated.

Overall standing

Conclusions
 FC Barcelona-Cifec -- EHF Champions League and Liga ASOBAL Champion
 BM Ciudad Real -- EHF Champions League
 Portland San Antonio -- EHF Champions League
 BM Valladolid -- EHF Champions League
 Caja España Ademar León -- EHF Cup Winner's Cup
 CD Bidasoa -- EHF Cup
 CAI BM Aragón -- EHF Cup
 BM Alcobendas—Relegated to División de Honor B
 CB Cangas—Relegated to División de Honor B

Top goal scorers

Top goalkeepers

Liga ASOBAL seasons
1
Spain